Habitam Alemu Bayih (born 9 July 1997) is an Ethiopian middle-distance runner specialising in the 800 metres.

Career 
Born in Merawi, Ethiopia, Alemu was encouraged to try running by a school teacher who entered her into her first competition, which she won. Further encouraged by her brother, she began to train seriously, and after running at the national championships, she was invited to join a club in Addis Ababa.

Alemu represented her country at the 2015 World Championships, and was a finalist at the 2016 World Indoor Championships. At the 2016 Rio Olympics, she ran a personal best to progress through the heats, but was eliminated in the semi-finals.

She placed sixth in the 800 metres at the 2020 Tokyo Olympics.

Alemu twice earned overall 800m World Indoor Tour victory, winning in 2019 and in 2021.

Competition record

Circuit wins
 Diamond League
 2017 (800 m): Birmingham British Grand Prix
 World Athletics Indoor Tour 800 m overall winner: 2019, 2021
 2019: Toruń Copernicus Cup, Düsseldorf PSD Bank Meeting
 2021: Toruń, Villa de Madrid Indoor Meeting

Personal bests
 800 metres – 1:56.71 (Monaco 2018)
 800 metres indoor – 1:58.19 (Toruń 2021)
 1500 metres – 4:01.41 (Doha 2018)
 1500 metres indoor – 4:02.52 (Toruń 2022)

References

External links

Habitam Alemu Athletics profile

1997 births
Living people
Ethiopian female middle-distance runners
Place of birth missing (living people)
World Athletics Championships athletes for Ethiopia
Athletes (track and field) at the 2015 African Games
Athletes (track and field) at the 2016 Summer Olympics
Olympic athletes of Ethiopia
African Games competitors for Ethiopia
Athletes (track and field) at the 2020 Summer Olympics